Jhapa Gold Cup (Nepali: झापा गोल्डकप) is a football tournament held yearly in Jhapa, Province No. 1, Nepal. It is held at the Domalal Rajbanshi stadium in Birtamode Jhapa, Nepal.

History
The Jhapa Gold Cup started in 2016. The first tournament was won by the Nepal Army Club, who have has won the cup thrice while host Jhapa XI has been runner up four times.

Results

Performance

See also
Pokhara Cup
Aaha! Gold Cup
Simara Gold Cup

References

Football in Nepal
Football cup competitions in Nepal
2016 establishments in Nepal